Yao Ximing  (born September 15, 1956) is a former badminton player from China and current coach at the Vancouver Racquet Club in Vancouver, B.C., Canada.

Career 
A doubles specialist, Yao and partner Sun Zhian captured the men's doubles title at the 1979 World Championships in Hangzhou run by the short-lived World Badminton Federation, a China-led organization then in competition with the older International Badminton Federation. When the political complaints against the International Badminton Federation were resolved, Yao and Sun won men's doubles at the 1981 World Games in Santa Clara, California, the first major IBF sanctioned tournament in which China's players participated. In 1982 Yao and Sun helped China wrest the coveted Thomas Cup (men's world team trophy) from Indonesia, by defeating Indonesia's Kartono and Heryanto and thus gaining the critical fifth point in a best of nine match series. Yao and Sun participated in the 1983 IBF World Championships in Copenhagen but they were eliminated in the quarterfinals. Yao later migrated to the USA where he coached and played, winning the 1986 U.S. Open men's doubles with former Pakistani star Tariq Wadood. A few years later he moved to Canada where he became a coach at the Vancouver Racquet Club.

Achievements

World Championships 

Men's doubles

World Games 

Men's doubles

Asian Championships 

Men's doubles

Invitational tournament 

Men's doubles

References 

1956 births
Living people
Chinese male badminton players
Chinese badminton coaches
Asian Games medalists in badminton
Asian Games gold medalists for China
Badminton players at the 1982 Asian Games
Medalists at the 1982 Asian Games
World Games medalists in badminton
World Games gold medalists
Competitors at the 1981 World Games
Badminton players from Guangdong
People from Zhanjiang